Francis Dunlop (December 6, 1928 – July 7, 2014) was an American jazz drummer.

Dunlop, born in Buffalo, New York, grew up in a musical family and began playing guitar at age nine and drums at ten. He was playing professionally by age 16 and received some classical education in percussion. He toured with Big Jay McNeely and recorded with Moe Koffman in 1950 before serving in the Army during the Korean War. After his discharge he played with Sonny Stitt, Charles Mingus, Sonny Rollins (1958, 1966–67), Maynard Ferguson (1958–60), Lena Horne, Duke Ellington (1960), and Thelonious Monk (1960–64); it is for his recordings with the last of these that he is principally remembered. Later in his life he recorded with Lionel Hampton (1975–81), Earl Hines (1973–74), Ray Crawford, and Joe Zawinul.

In 1984, Dunlop retired, having recorded on over 100 albums.

His brother, Boyd Lee Dunlop, was a jazz pianist who was "rediscovered" while living at a nursing home in Buffalo. He was profiled in a New York Times article in December, 2011.

Discography

As sideman
With Maynard Ferguson
 A Message from Birdland (Roulette, 1959)
 Swingin' My Way Through College (Roulette, 1959)
 Maynard Ferguson Plays Jazz for Dancing (Roulette, 1959)
 Maynard '64 (Roulette, 1963)

With Lionel Hampton
 Alive & Jumping (MPS, 1978)
 Lionel Hampton and His Band Live at The Muzeval (Timeless, 1978)
 Lionel Hampton and His Jazz Giants 77 (Black and Blue, 1977)
 Aurex Jazz Festival '81 (Eastworld 1981)
 Outrageous (Timeless, 1982)

With Thelonious Monk
 Monk in France (Riverside, 1965)
 Monk's Dream (Columbia, 1963)
 Criss Cross (Columbia, 1963)
 Thelonious Monk in Italy (Riverside, 1963)
 Miles & Monk at Newport (Columbia, 1963)
 Thelonious Monk in Europe Vol. 1 (Riverside, 1963)
 Thelonious Monk in Europe Vol. 2 (Riverside, 1964)
 Thelonious Monk in Europe Vol. 3 (Riverside, 1964)
 Big Band and Quartet in Concert (Columbia, 1964)
 Two Hours with Thelonious (Riverside, 1969)
 Monk in Tokyo (Columbia, 1969)
 Always Know (Columbia, 1979)
 Blue Monk (Baybridge, 1983)
 Blues Five Spot (Milestone, 1984)
 Live! at The Village Gate (Xanadu, 1985)
 Live in Stockholm 1961 (Dragon, 1987)

With others
 Mose Allison, Swingin' Machine (Atlantic, 1963)
 Bill Barron, The Tenor Stylings of Bill Barron (Savoy, 1961)
 Richard Davis, The Philosophy of the Spiritual (Cobblestone, 1972)
 Herman Foster, Have You Heard Herman Foster (Epic, 1960)
 Dodo Greene, Ain't What You Do (Time, 1959)
 Melba Liston, Melba Liston and Her 'Bones (MetroJazz, 1959)
 Billy Mackel, At Last (Black and Blue, 1977)
 Charles Mingus, Tijuana Moods (RCA Victor, 1962)
 Martin Mull, Normal (Capricorn 1974)
 Sonny Rollins, Alfie (Impulse!, 1966)
 Wilbur Ware, The Chicago Sound (Riverside, 1957)
 Randy Weston, Highlife (Colpix, 1963)
 Leo Wright, Soul Talk (Vortex, 1970)
 Joe Zawinul, To You with Love (Strand, 1961)

References
 
[ Frankie Dunlop] at Allmusic
Leonard Feather and Ira Gitler, The Biographical Encyclopedia of Jazz. Oxford, 1999, p. 196.
Frankie Dunlop interview by Scott K. Fish

American jazz drummers
1928 births
2014 deaths
Musicians from Buffalo, New York
Thelonious Monk
Jazz musicians from New York (state)